The Cross Keys may refer to several pubs in England:

 The Cross Keys, Chelsea
 The Cross Keys, Covent Garden
 The Cross Keys, Hammersmith
 The Cross Keys, Totternhoe

See also 
 Cross Keys, Dagenham
 Cross Keys Inn, Bath, England
 Cross keys (disambiguation)